Tommaso Malombra (died 1513) was a Roman Catholic prelate who served as Bishop of Ston (1463–1513).

Biography
On 7 Feb 1463, Tommaso Malombra was appointed by Pope Pius II as Bishop of Ston. He served as Bishop of Ston until his death in 1513.

References 

1513 deaths
16th-century Roman Catholic bishops in the Republic of Venice
Bishops appointed by Pope Pius II